The Bahrain Handball Federation (BHF) is the governing body of handball and beach handball in the Kingdom of Bahrain. Founded in 1974, BHF is affiliated to the International Handball Federation and the Asian Handball Federation. BHF is also affiliated to the Bahrain Olympic Committee. It is based in Manama.

BHF Presidents

Competitions hosted

International
 2007 Men's Youth World Handball Championship

Continental
 2016 Asian Men's Youth Handball Championship
 2016 Asian Men's Handball Championship
 2014 Asian Men's Handball Championship
 2012 Asian Men's Youth Handball Championship
 1998 Asian Men's Junior Handball Championship
 1993 Asian Men's Handball Championship

References

External links
 Bahrain Handball Federation at the IHF website.

Handball governing bodies
Handball in Bahrain
Asian Handball Federation
Sport in Bahrain
Handball
1974 establishments in Bahrain
Sports organizations established in 1974